Have Guitar Will Travel may refer to:

 Have Guitar Will Travel (Eddy Arnold album), 1959
 Have Guitar Will Travel (Bo Diddley album), 1960 
 Have Guitar Will Travel Tour, 2018 
 Have Guitar, Will Travel (Joe Perry album), 2009
Have Guitar, Will Travel Tour